A Night to Remember is a mystery comedy film starring Loretta Young and Brian Aherne.  It was directed by Richard Wallace, and is based on the novel The Frightened Stiff by Kelley Roos. A mystery writer and his wife try to solve a murder when a corpse appears in their Greenwich Village apartment.

Plot
Nancy (Loretta Young) and Jeff Troy (Brian Aherne) move into a somber-looking basement apartment building on 13 Gay Street, Greenwich Village, where the residents all act very strangely. Nancy recognizes one of the residents, Anne Carstairs (Jeff Donnell), who acts very oddly and not at all the way Nancy remembers her. While eating in a restaurant, Nancy overhears a man, later identified as Louis Kaufman, talking on the telephone telling someone to meet him in the basement apartment. Louis goes to the basement apartment and is later found dead in the backyard, after having been drowned in the apartment's bathtub.

Jeff recognizes the basement apartment as a former speakeasy and that the "monster" the housekeeper was afraid of is a turtle called "Old Hickory". Jeff and Nancy figure out that all the residents were being blackmailed by a man named Andrew Bruhl, who used to be a private investigator. Bruhl made all the blackmail victims live in one building to keep an eye on them.

Jeff and Nancy figure out that Bruhl killed Kaufman, and that Bruhl is someone who lives in the building. The suspects are Anne Carstairs (Jeff Donnell); her husband, Scott Carstairs (William Wright); Eddie Turner, the landlord; Polly Franklin (Lee Patrick), who works at the restaurant; Lingle (Richard Gaines), another resident; and the housekeeper, Mrs. Salter (Blanche Yurka).

Cast
 Loretta Young as Nancy Troy
 Brian Aherne as Jeff Troy
 Jeff Donnell as Anne Carstairs
 William Wright as Scott Carstairs
 Sidney Toler as Inspector Hankins
 Gale Sondergaard as Mrs. Devoe
 Donald MacBride as Bolling
 Lee Patrick as Polly Franklin
 Don Costello as Eddie Turner
 Blanche Yurka as Mrs. Salter
 Richard Gaines	 as Lingle
 James Burke as Pat Murphy

Critical response
Film critic Bosley Crowther wrote in The New York Times in 1943 that the film's "plot is tedious and involved" and "the film is largely a succession of looming shadows, conversations and mediocre gags and people creeping out of the darkness and saying "Boo!" Writing in DVD Talk, Jamie S. Rich described the film as "not as memorable as its title would have you believe," and although the "plot doesn't really add up to very much, Young is a joy to watch and it's all so light and fluffy, A Night to Remember ends up being pretty hard to hate."

References

External links
 
 
 
 

1942 films
1940s crime comedy films
American black-and-white films
American crime comedy films
American romantic comedy films
Columbia Pictures films
1940s comedy mystery films
Films based on American novels
Films based on mystery novels
Films directed by Richard Wallace
Films produced by Samuel Bischoff
American comedy mystery films
1942 romantic comedy films
1940s American films